TRO is a healthcare design firm headquartered in Boston, MA. The firm has a multidisciplinary service offering of architecture, engineering and interior design. TRO celebrated its 100th anniversary in 2009.

In January 2018, TRO was acquired by SmithGroupJJR.

Awards
Building Design + Construction, "Building Team Awards- Gold Award Winner," MaineGeneral Medical Center Alfond Center for Health, 2014
 
Engineering News Record (ENR), "Best Healthcare Project Award - New England Region," MaineGeneral Medical Center Alfond Center for Health, 2014

Building Design + Construction, "Building Team Awards- Bronze Award Winner," Lawrence + Memorial Hospital
Cancer Center, 2014

Building Design + Construction, "Collaborators Team Award- Recognized Project," Lawrence + Memorial Hospital
Cancer Center, 2014

Engineering News Record (ENR), "Healthcare Project Merit Award - New York Region," Lawrence + Memorial Hospital
Cancer Center, 2014

The Real Estate Exchange (Connecticut Chapter of CREW), “Blue Ribbon Award,” Saint Francis Hospital and Medical Center
John T. O’Connell Tower Phase II, 2012

Associated General Contractors (AGC) of Connecticut, “Award for Excellence,” Saint Francis Hospital and Medical Center  
John T. O’Connell Tower Phase II, 2012

Brick in Architecture Awards, "Best in Class for Health Care," - Methodist Le Bonheur Germantown Hospital's Women's and Children's Pavilion, 2011

Illuminating Engineering Society (IES), "Illumination Award of Merit," MaineGeneral Medical Center Alfond Center for Cancer care, 2009

References

External links
http://tro-design.com

Architecture firms based in Massachusetts